Barium ferrite, abbreviated BaFe, BaM, is the chemical compound with the formula BaFe12O19. This and related ferrite materials are components in magnetic stripe cards and loudspeaker magnets.

BaFe is described as Ba2+(Fe3+)12(O2−)19. The Fe3+ centers are ferrimagnetically coupled, and one unit cell of BaM has a net magnetic moment of 40μB. This area of technology is usually considered to be an application of the related fields of materials science and solid state chemistry.

Barium ferrite is a highly magnetic material, has a high packing density, and is a metal oxide. Studies of this material date at least as far back as 1931, and it has found applications in magnetic card strips, speakers, and magnetic tapes. One area in particular it has found success in is long-term data storage; the material is magnetic, resistant to temperature change, corrosion and oxidization.

Chemical structure
The Fe3+ centers, with a high-spin d5 configuration, are ferrimagnetically coupled. This area of technology is usually considered to be an application of the related fields of materials science and solid state chemistry.

A related family of industrially useful "hexagonal ferrites" are known, also containing barium. In contrast to the usual spinel structure, these materials feature hexagonal close-packed framework of oxides.  Furthermore, some of the oxygen centers are replaced by Ba2+ ions. Formulas for these species include BaFe12O19, BaFe15O23, and BaFe18O27.

A one-step hydrothermal process can be used to form crystals of barium ferrite, by mixing barium chloride, ferrous chloride, potassium nitrate, and sodium hydroxide with a hydroxide to chloride concentration ratio of 2:1. Nano-particles are prepared from ferric nitrate, barium chloride, sodium citrate, and sodium hydroxide. The typical preparation, however, is by calcining barium carbonate with iron(III) oxide:

BaCO3   +   6 Fe2O3   ->[\text{Δ}]   BaFe12O19   +   CO2

Properties
Barium ferrite has been considered for long term data storage. The material has proven to be resistant to a number of different environmental stresses, including humidity and corrosion. Because ferrites are already oxidized it can not be oxidized any further. This is one reason ferrites are so resistant to corrosion. Barium ferrite also proved to be resistant to thermal demagnetization, another issue common with long-term storage. The Curie temperature is typically around 450 C (723 K).

When barium ferrite magnets increase in temperature, their high intrinsic coercivity improves, this is what makes it more resistant to thermal demagnetization. Ferrite magnets are the only type of magnets that become substantially more resistant to demagnetization as temperature increases. This characteristic of barium ferrite makes it a popular choice in motor and generator designs and also in loudspeaker applications. Ferrite magnets can be used in temperatures up to 300 °C, which makes it a perfect to be used in the applications mentioned above. Ferrite magnets are extremely good insulators and don't allow any electrical current to flow through them and they are brittle which shows their ceramic characteristics. Ferrite magnets also have good machining properties, which allows for the material to be cut in many shapes and sizes.

Chemical properties
Barium ferrites are robust ceramics that are generally stable to moisture and corrosion-resistant.
BaFe is also an oxide so it does not break down due to oxidation as much as a metal alloy might; giving BaFe a much greater life expectancy.

Mechanical properties
Metal particles (MP) have been used to store data on tapes and magnetic strips but they have reached their limit for high capacity data storage. In order to increase their capacity by (25x) on data tape the MP had to increase the tape length by (45%) and track density by over (500%) which made it necessary to reduce the size of the individual particles. As the particles were reduced in size, the passivizing coating needed to prevent the oxidation and deterioration of the MP had to become thicker. This presented a problem for as the passivation coating got thicker it became harder to achieve an acceptable signal to noise ratio.

Barium ferrite completely out classes MP, mostly because BaFe is already in its oxidized state and so is not restricted in its size by a protective coating. Also due to its hexagonal pattern it is easier to organize compared to the unorganized rod like MP. Another factor is the difference in the size of the particles, in MP the size ranges from 40 to 100 nm while the BaFe is only 20 nm. So the smallest MP particle is still double the size of the BaFe particles.

Applications 

Barium ferrite is used in applications such as recording media, permanent magnets, and magnetic stripe cards (credit cards, hotel keys, ID cards). Due to the stability of the material, it is able to be greatly reduced in size, making the packing density much greater. Earlier media devices utilized doped acicular oxide materials to yield the coercivity values necessary to record. In recent decades, barium ferrite has replaced acicular oxides; without any dopants, the acicular oxides produce very low coercivity values, making the material very magnetically soft, while barium ferrite's higher coercivity levels make the material magnetically hard and thus a superior choice for recording material applications.

Magnetic Stripes 
ID cards using barium ferrite are made with a magnetic fingerprint that identifies them, allowing readers to self-calibrate.

Speaker magnets
Barium ferrite is a common material for speaker magnets. The materials can be formed into almost any shape and size using a process called sintering, whereby powdered barium ferrite is pressed into a mold, and then heated until it fuses together. The barium ferrite turns into a solid block while still retaining its magnetic properties. The magnets have an excellent resistance to demagnetization, allowing them to still be useful in speaker units over a long period of time.

Tape Data Storage Media
Barium ferrite is used for enterprise level and commodity Linear Tape-Open (LTO) tape storage media. Because of its high density, barium ferrite has led to data capacity improvements in both enterprise and LTO tapes over prior metal particle (MP) media technology.

Developments in the field have also resulted in the reduction of the size of BaFe particles to about 20 nm. This contrasts with MP technology, which has problems shrinking the particles past 100 nm.

The shape is another factor.  Metal particles are often cylindrical shapes that do not pack or stack well. Barium ferrite has better packing properties. BaFe can be reduced to a smaller size and higher packing density because of its hexagonal structure and can be stacked more effectively. This leads to better control over magnetic orientation and improved signal-to-noise characteristics.

Natural occurrence
The compound occurs in the nature, although is exceedingly rare. It is called barioferrite and is related to pyrometamorphism.

References

Barium compounds
Ferrites